Huang Jianhua, also known as Kenneth Huang (born 1965), is a Chinese businessman. Huang founded Sportscorp China in 2004. In 2009, Huang began investing in Chinese sports leagues and teams.

Early life and education
Born in Guangzhou, China into a family with close business and government ties, he graduated in 1984 from Sun Yat-sen University. Huang then pursued under graduate studies at Columbia University, and then obtained his Masters from St. John's University, before undertaking his MBA in financial management at New York University.

Career

Wall Street
In 1988, Huang became the first mainland educated Chinese person to work on Wall Street, as a public relations executive.

Sportscorp China
Huang and Chicago-based sports consultant Marc Ganis, founded Sportscorp China in 2004, a company that helps bridge sports and sponsorship deals between the United States and China. This enabled Chinese sponsorship and rights distribution deals with both the Houston Rockets and the New York Yankees.

Huang introduced the Cleveland Cavaliers in 2009 to Tsingtao Brewery, which resulted in an agreement between the two. In 2009, Huang and his partner Adrian Cheng, whose family controls the Hong Kong conglomerate New World Development, invested in Chinese sports leagues and teams. It was reported in early 2010 that Huang had acquired a 15% shareholding in the Cleveland Cavaliers, considered at the time the first significant investment in a large US sports franchise by Chinese investors. However, in April 2010 it was made clear by the Cavaliers that Huang's role with the Cavaliers was to have acted as a middleman to secure the team's sponsorship with Tsingtao. Adrien Cheng left his partnership with Huang soon after for unspecified reasons. After buying into and hence becoming co-chair of both the National Basketball League of China and the Chinese Baseball League,

Huang also bought the Jilin Northeast Tigers.

Liverpool deal and article
During an interview in April 2010 with the UK's The Mirror newspaper, Huang claimed to be at a "crucial stage" in negotiations to acquire the Liverpool F.C. team for £500 million. Four months later, Huang instead offered to pay off Liverpool's USD 374 million in debts it owed to the Royal Bank of Scotland in return for control of the team. At the time, Huang claimed that the massive Chinese sovereign wealth fund, China Investment Corporation, could become a silent investor in the deal. China Investment Corp, however, soon after denied this, saying it had "never heard of a plan to buy Liverpool or of Kenneth Huang". Huang eventually dropped out of the deal a few weeks later.
 
An August 2010 investigation by Sporting Intelligence claimed that, among other issues, Huang's claim to sit on the board of directors at the Bank of Communication's asset management division was false. The report also claimed that it had failed to verify any of Huang's educational qualifications - including his assertion that he completed an MBA at New York University and a Masters in Japanese at St. John's University - and added that he had only completed four months of his degree at Columbia University. The investigation was also unable to verify Huang's claims to have been voted the "No 1 philanthropist" in 2009 by the popular Chinese website Sina.com and BQ Magazine.

Recent developments
On 1 August 2012, Inter Milan announced that, club owner Massimo Moratti agreed to sell a minority interests of the club to a Chinese consortium led by Kenneth Huang. On the same day Inter announced an agreement was formed with China Railway Construction Corporation Limited for a new stadium project. However, the deal collapsed. The club was takeover by International Sports Capital, a company co-owned by Erick Thohir in 2013, with Moratti, Pirelli and many small investors as the minority shareholders.

References

1964 births
Living people
Businesspeople from Guangzhou
Sun Yat-sen University alumni
Columbia University alumni
St. John's University (New York City) alumni
New York University Stern School of Business alumni